George Preston Sheldon, Jr., born November 19, 1876, was an American tennis player who as active at the end of the 19th century. He won two men's doubles titles at the U.S. National Championships tennis at the Newport Casino together with Leo Ware.

In 1897 he reached the semifinals of the Western Championships and Canadian Championships. He played intercollegiate tennis and ice hockey for Yale.

Grand Slam finals

Doubles (2 titles, 1 runner-up)

External links

Sources

 Birthdate sourced from Brian Pendleton And His Descendants, 1599–1910, compiled by Everett Hall Pendleton, 1911.

19th-century American people
19th-century male tennis players
American male tennis players
United States National champions (tennis)
Grand Slam (tennis) champions in men's doubles
Year of death missing
1876 births
Yale Bulldogs men's ice hockey players